Krasnaya Gora is an urban-type settlement in Bryansk Oblast, Russia. It is the administrative center of Krasnogorsky District. Population:

History

First mentioned in 1387 as a guard settlement. Listed in the "List of Ruthenian Cities Far and Near". In 1648 Popov Gora hosted a fight between Cossacks of Bohdan Khmelnytsky and six thousandth detachment of Polish Hetman Vishnevetzky.

In the past century, Popova Gora was sotnia center Popogorskoy hundreds and parish center Popovogorskoy parish. Since 1929 - the regional center. Since 1968 it is settlement of urban type.

Ecological problems 
As a result of the Chernobyl disaster on April 26, 1986, part of the territory of Bryansk Oblast has been contaminated with radionuclides (mainly Gordeyevsky, Klimovsky, Klintsovsky, Krasnogorsky, Surazhsky, and Novozybkovsky Districts). In 1999, some 226,000 people lived in areas with the contamination level above 5 Curie/km2, representing approximately 16% of the oblast's population.

References

´
Urban-type settlements in Bryansk Oblast
Surazhsky Uyezd